Johannes Huber (born 12 January 1987) is a German politician and since 2017 member of the Bundestag.

Life and politics

Huber was born 1987 in the West German town of Moosburg and studied sociology at the Catholic University of Eichstätt-Ingolstadt.

Huber entered the AfD in 2014 and became after the 2017 German federal election member of the bundestag. In December 2021 Huber left the AfD and their parliamentary group.

Political positions 
In autumn 2020 Huber posted several messages in Telegram groups of COVID-Deniers ("Querdenker") and calls on its members to "terrorize" politicians of other parties.

At the end of November 2021, Johannes Huber wrote instructions in a closed Telegram group on how to achieve a false positive test result in a PCR test for a Covid 19 infection. After two weeks of quarantine, one could have achieved the status of a recovered person and, despite the lack of a vaccination, would not be subject to the access restrictions imposed by the 2G rule. When his statements became public he wrote that his instructions were obviously useless and "obviously not serious".

References

1987 births
Living people
Members of the Bundestag for Bavaria
People from Freising (district)
Members of the Bundestag 2017–2021
Members of the Bundestag 2021–2025
Members of the Bundestag for the Alternative for Germany